John White (1854 – 8 January 1943) was a South Australian painter and pharmacist.

History
John White was born in Bath, England and trained as a pharmacist in Bristol. He emigrated to South Australia in 1878, and set up a chemist's shop on Rundle Street, Kent Town, and was in partnership with Philip John Evans as chemists of The Parade, Norwood until April 1888. He purchased the retail arm of F. H. Faulding & Co., and set up pharmacies in Graves Street, Kadina from 1919, operated by his son H. G. White, and at Port Lincoln.

He was a member of George Brookman's original Coolgardie Goldmining Prospecting Company Limited, and made a fortune in the gold mines of Western Australia. He retired in 1899, leaving W. J. Burton as manager of the business.

Painting
He was highly respected as a fine amateur painter and connoisseur, judge and lecturer.
He was a founding member of the Adelaide Easel Club in 1892, and its treasurer from 1899. He joined the South Australian Society of Arts when the two clubs merged in 1901 and served as its president 1911–1914; 1919–1921 and 1923–1927. He was a member of the Board of Governors of the South Australian Institute (which included the Public Library, Museum and Art Gallery) and president of the council, S.A. School of Arts and Crafts 1926–1928.

Works held by the Art Gallery of South Australia
Land of the salt bush 1898
From the Sand Dunes 1899
Near the Pioneer's Anchorage, Nepean Bay, Kangaroo Island 1908
Swamp Lands 1908

Selected works
These are some works which were praised by contemporary media:
Torrens Lake at Sunrise 1888
Joy cometh in the morning 1901
Where the Mallee Grows 1902
Where Ti-trees Bend 1903
The Great North Land 1905
Springtime 1906 
The Pioneer's Anchorage, Nepean Bay, Kangaroo Island 1908
The Golden Hour pastel 1910
Sunset, Nepean Bay pastel 1912
He continued into old age to paint and exhibit fine works, but was no longer selected for special comment by newspaper critics.

Other interests
He was on the board of management of the Adelaide Hospital.

Family
He married Katherine Isabella "Kate" Brookman ( – 2 November 1893), second daughter of Benjamin Brookman of Parkside, South Australia, and sister of Sir George Brookman, on 24 August 1882. She died after giving birth to son Howard.
Leslie Ford White ( – ) married Violet Hasheen Hall on 21 June 1904; they were divorced 1921.
Howard Gordon White (24 October 1893 – ), pharmacist, lived Melbourne Street, North Adelaide.

References 

Australian pharmacists
1854 births
1943 deaths
19th-century Australian painters
19th-century Australian male artists
20th-century Australian painters
20th-century Australian male artists
Australian male painters